Dactylosternum abdominale is a species of water scavenger beetle in the family Hydrophilidae. It is found in Africa, Australia, the Caribbean Sea, Europe and Northern Asia (excluding China), Central America, North America, Oceania, South America, and Southern Asia.

References

Further reading

External links

 

Hydrophilidae
Articles created by Qbugbot
Beetles described in 1792